Julia Schwarzbach (née Rohde) (born 13 May 1989, Görlitz) is a German weightlifter. She competed at the 2008 Summer Olympics in the women's 53 kg, finishing 7th with a total of 185 kg (snatch = 82 kg, clean and jerk = 103 kg).  In the same event at the 2012 Summer Olympics, she finished 11th, with a total of 193 kg (snatch = 85 kg, clean and jerk = 108 kg).

References

German female weightlifters
Living people
Olympic weightlifters of Germany
Weightlifters at the 2008 Summer Olympics
Weightlifters at the 2012 Summer Olympics
1989 births
People from Görlitz
Sportspeople from Saxony
21st-century German women